Maurizio Squillante is an Italian composer. His opera The Wings of Dedalus premiered in 2004 and was recorded in 2017.

References

 

Living people
Year of birth missing (living people)